In music, Op. 66 stands for Opus number 66. Compositions that are assigned this number include:

 Britten – War Requiem
 Chopin – Fantaisie-Impromptu
 Dvořák – Scherzo capriccioso
 Mendelssohn – Piano Trio No. 2
 Myaskovsky – Cello Concerto
 Schumann – Bilder aus Osten (Pictures from the East), 6 Impromptus for piano 4-hands
 Scriabin – Piano Sonata No. 8
 Strauss – Der Krämerspiegel